The Pinkerton lecture series is held by the Institution of Engineering and Technology in commemoration and honour of John Pinkerton, the pivotal engineer who was involved with designing the UK's first business computer in 1951. The first lecture was held in 2000 and the event has taken place every year since then.

The Lecturers

2000 Maurice Wilkes
2001 David Caminer
2002 David Cleevely
2004 Hermann Hauser
2005 Subhash Bhatnagar
2006 Tony Hey
2007 Tim Berners-Lee
2008 Alex Balfour
2009 John Carey
2010 Steve Furber
2011 Mike Short
2012 Kevin Warwick
2013 Robin Saxby
2014 Jim Morrish
2015 Robert Pepper

References 

Awards established in 2000
British lecture series
British science and technology awards
History of computing in the United Kingdom
Institution of Engineering and Technology
Science lecture series